This is a list of seasons played by Durham County Cricket Club in English cricket, from the club's first appearance in a major competition to the most recent completed season. It details the club's achievements in major competitions, and the top run-scorers and wicket-takers for each season.

Seasons

Key

Division shown in bold when it changes due to promotion, relegation or league reorganisation.  Top run scorer/wicket taker shown in bold when he was the leading run scorer/wicket taker in the country.

Key to league record:
Div - division played in (see opposite)
P – games played
W – games won
L – games lost
D – games drawn
NR – games with no result
Abnd – games abandoned
Pts – points
Pos – final position

Key to rounds:
RPre - preliminary round
R1 – first round
R2 – second round, etc.
QF – quarter-final
SF – semi-final
Grp – group stage
RU - runners-up
n/a – not applicable

See also
Derbyshire County Cricket Club seasons
Kent County Cricket Club seasons
Northamptonshire County Cricket Club seasons

Notes

References
Cricket Archive

Seasons, Durham County Cricket Club
Seasons
Cricket seasons